Arta statalis, the posturing arta moth, is a species of snout moth in the genus Arta. It was described by Augustus Radcliffe Grote in 1875 and is the type species of its genus. It is found in North America including Delaware,
Florida, Georgia, Illinois, Iowa, Massachusetts, New Jersey, New York, North Carolina, Oklahoma, Pennsylvania, South Carolina, Tennessee and Virginia.

The wingspan is about 15 mm.

References

Chrysauginae
Moths of North America
Fauna of the Eastern United States
Fauna of the Southeastern United States
Moths described in 1875
Taxa named by Augustus Radcliffe Grote